Burros is a 2021 American short drama film written and directed by Jefferson Stein and starring a cast of first-time actors from the Tohono O'odham Nation where it is set. Eva Longoria serves as an executive producer.

The film held its world premiere at the 20th Annual Tribeca Film Festival on June 18, 2021, and won the Jury Award in the Live Action Short category at the 25th Annual New York International Children's Film Festival qualifying it for the 95th Annual Academy Awards.

Plot 
After her father, a Tohono O'odham tracker, leaves for work assisting the United States Border Patrol on the Mexico–U.S. border, Elsa, a six-year-old Tohono O'odham girl, finds a Hispanic migrant her age, separated from her father as she crossed the border into the United States. Unable to communicate, Elsa takes her through her community in Sells, Arizona and ultimately to her grandmother, Gagi, who speaks Spanish, English, and O'odham and bridges the language barrier.

Cast 

 Amaya Juan as Elsa
 Zuemmy Carrillo as Ena
 Virginia Patricio as Gagi
 Rupert Lopez as Joe
 Armondo 'Mondo' Gonzales as Mondo
 Michael Geronimo as Beatboxer
 Carlos Chico as Beatboxer

Production

Development and pre-production 
Jefferson Stein researched the Tohono O’odham Nation for two years and worked with the community on the subject matter of the film. He and the producers lived by the reservation during pre-production. Stein further explained this, by saying: "Awareness is the first thing. There were hundreds of stories that I heard while I was there that inspired moments of this project." The film is told over a 24-hour period, ending where it starts, done to highlight the cyclical nature of the separation of families at the border.

The film was developed through fiscal sponsorship by Film Independent.

Casting 
The actors in the film had not acted before. Amaya Juan was discovered through the local Toka team, the women-only sport she plays in the film. Zuemmy Carrillo was cast during lunch at a Bilingual elementary school in nearby Tucson.

Filming 
Principal photography took place over four days on the Tohono O'odham Nation Reservation.

Release 
The film had its World Premiere at the Tribeca Film Festival on June 18, 2021.

Awards and nominations

References

External links 

 Official Site
 

2021 films
2021 drama films
American drama short films
Films set in Arizona
Spanish-language American films
Films about immigration
Films about immigration to the United States
Films about Native Americans
Films about children
Films about refugees
2020s American films